The 1991 Midwestern Collegiate Conference men's basketball tournament (now known as the Horizon League men's basketball tournament) was held March 7–9 at UD Arena in Dayton, Ohio.

Xavier defeated  in the championship game, 81–65, to win their sixth MCC/Horizon League men's basketball tournament title.

The Musketeers received an automatic bid to the 1991 NCAA tournament as the #14 seed in the Midwest region.

Format
All eight conference members participated in the tournament and were seeded based on regular season conference records.

Bracket

References

Horizon League men's basketball tournament
Tournament
Midwestern City Conference men's basketball tournament
Midwestern City Conference men's basketball tournament